Alburnus thessalicus is a species of ray-finned fish in the carp family Cyprinidae. It is a freshwater fish occurring in lakes and streams in Europe. It is found in Albania, Bulgaria, Greece, North Macedonia, and Serbia.

This species is up to 15.5 centimeters long. It inhabits open waters of medium to large rivers, where it forages close to surface.

This is an abundant fish and it is not considered to be a threatened species.

References

thessalicus
Fish described in 1950
Taxa named by Alexander I. Stephanidis